Bhalukhop (also referred to as Bhalukhop Khasmahal) is a village in the Kalimpong I CD block in the Kalimpong Sadar subdivision of the Kalimpong district in the state of West Bengal, India.

Geography

Location

It is just 10 km from Kalimpong.

Area overview
The map alongside shows the Kalimpong Sadar subdivision of Kalimpong district. This region is characterized by abruptly rising hills and numerous small streams. It is a predominantly rural area with 77.67% of the population living in rural areas and only 22.23% living in the urban areas. While Kalimpong is the only municipality, Dungra is the sole census town in the entire area. The economy is agro-based and there are six tea gardens in the Gorubathan CD block. In 2011, Kalimpong subdivision had a literacy rate of 81.85%, comparable with the highest levels of literacy in the districts of the state. While the first degree college in the subdivision was established at Kalimpong in 1962the entire subdivision (and now the entire district), other than the head-quarters, had to wait till as late as 2015 (more than half a century) to have their first degree colleges at Pedong and Gorubathan.

Note: The map alongside presents some of the notable locations in the subdivision. All places marked in the map are linked in the larger full screen map.

Demographics
According to the 2011 Census of India, Bhalukhop Khasmahal had a total population of 5,254 of which 2,660 (51%) were males and 2,594 (49%) were females. There were 445 persons in the age range of 0 to 6 years. The total number of literate people in Bhalukhop Khasmahal was 3,879 (80.66% of the population over 6 years).

Tourism
Bhalukhop can be a good base with day trips for visiting places such as Delo, Lava, Sillery Gaon and Icche Gaon. Being so near Kalimpong, one can also go and see such places as Cactus Garden, Durpin Monastery and Golf Course.

References

Villages in Kalimpong district